"Everything Goes On" is a single by American electronic music producer Porter Robinson, released in collaboration with video game League of Legends on July 14, 2022. It is Robinson's first release since his album Nurture (2021).

The song is tied to the Star Guardian 2022 event in League of Legends, a tribute to the magical girl genre of anime. The song draws inspiration from the magical girl anime Madoka Magica.

Background and composition 

During the COVID-19 pandemic, Robinson's fiancé Rika introduced him to League of Legends. When League of Legends developer Riot Games released the animated series Arcane, Robinson realized he wanted to be involved in one of their projects. He then decided to approach Riot about contributing a song; they proposed he work on the Star Guardian 2022 theme, to be accompanied by an animation of about two-and-a-half minutes in length.

Robinson frequently redid the lyrics to "Everything Goes On" while working on it, something he attributed to his focus on lyrics which has grown over time. Initially drawing inspiration from an animated short released by Riot in 2019, Robinson eventually shifted towards writing about something closer to his own experiences.

In addition to the electronic elements present in his previous work, "Everything Goes On" draws from elements of indie rock and was partially performed by Robinson on the guitar, which he described as a "different workflow" for himself.

Music video 
"Everything Goes On" was released alongside an official music video to start off the Star Guardian 2022 event in League of Legends. Robinson did not work on the animated video which, according to The Verge, "created an interesting contrast" at times due to the personal nature of the song and its lyrics.

Critical reception 
Writing for Billboard, Kat Bein describes "Everything Goes On" as a "heartfelt sing-along", writing that it "captures all the beauty, power and sadness that comes with sacrificing your life as a teenage girl to protect the world; and it does it all without sacrificing any part of its Porter Robinson-ness."

In an article for NME, Ali Shutler describes "Everything Goes On" as "a beautiful song that wrestles with melancholy, hope, love, desire and loss."

Track listing

Charts

References 

2022 singles
2022 songs
Porter Robinson songs
Song recordings produced by Porter Robinson
Songs written by Porter Robinson
League of Legends